Paul Carpenter may refer to:
Paul Carpenter (actor) (1921–1964), Canadian actor and singer
Paul Carpenter (baseball) (1894–1968), minor league baseball player
Paul B. Carpenter (1928–2002), American politician

See also
Paul Carpenter Standley (1884–1963), American botanist